Yttrium nitride, YN, is a nitride of yttrium.

Yttrium nitride  is hard ceramic material similar to titanium nitride and zirconium nitride.

The nitrides of lanthanum, scandium, and yttrium show semiconducting properties and additionally the lattice structure of YN differs only by 8% from that of gallium nitride. This makes YN a possible buffer layer between a substrate and the GaN layer during GaN crystal growth.

References

Nitrides
Yttrium compounds
Rock salt crystal structure